Grias colombiana is a species of woody plant in the family Lecythidaceae. It is found only in Colombia.

References

colombiana
Vulnerable plants
Endemic flora of Colombia
Taxonomy articles created by Polbot
Plants described in 1951